Trichobius corynorhini is a species of bat fly in the family Streblidae.

References

Hippoboscoidea
Articles created by Qbugbot
Insects described in 1910
Parasites of bats